Puerto Salgar is a municipality and town of Colombia in the northwestern part of the department of Cundinamarca. It came to international attention when the US ambassador in Colombia announced the Palanquero Air Base had entered a recertification process, possibly in order to host US military personnel as a replacement to the Manta Air Base.  As of July 2009, negotiations were ongoing.

References

Municipalities of Cundinamarca Department